JDS Inazuma (DE-203) is the second ship of the s of the Japan Maritime Self-Defense Force (JMSDF).

Development and design 
In FY1953, the Japanese government ordered three destroyer escorts,  and two ships of Ikazuchi class. These vessels were the first indigenous post-World War II Japanese destroyer escorts, but their propulsion systems were different because the JMSDF tried to find the best way in the propulsion systems for its future surface combatants. Akebono was a steam-powered vessel, but the Ikazuchi class were diesel-powered vessels.

Equipment of the Ikazuchi class was almost the same as those of Akebono, with two American 3"/50 caliber Mark 21 guns (or Type 54, the Japanese version) in two Mark 22 single mounts controlled by a Mark 51 director each, four Bofors 40 mm anti-aircraft guns in two dual mounts, a Hedgehog anti-submarine mortar and eight K-gun depth charge throwers. In 1959, all the Mark 21 guns were replaced by Mark 22 rapid-fire guns with Mark 34 single mounts and Mark 63 GFCS introduced in exchange of the reduction of Bofors 40 mm guns.

Construction and career
Inazuma was laid down on 25 December 1954 by Mitsui Engineering and Shipbuilding at their yard in Tamano and launched on 4 August 1955. The vessel commissioned on 5 March 1956. She was put into service and was incorporated into the Kure District Force.

On 1 August 1956, the 7th Escort Corps was newly formed under the 1st Escort Corps group and was Inazuma was incorporated with Akebono and sister ship .

A special refurbishment work was carried out by Kawasaki Heavy Industries at their Kobe Shipyard between 11 December 1958 and 25 March 1959, and the 54 type 50 caliber  single gun was replaced with the Mk.34 50 caliber 3-inch single quick-firing gun. The front  twin gun was removed, the fire control system on the bridge was changed from Mk.51 to Mk.63, and the Mk.34 shooting radar was also installed. In addition, air conditioners were installed in the battle compartment rooms.

On 10 December 1964, the 7th Escort Corps was reorganized under the 3rd Escort Corps group. On 15 March 1969, the 7th Escort Corps was reorganized under the Kure District Force.

On 31 March 1976, the vessel was changed to a storage ship, and the ship registration number was changed to YAC-31. Inazuma was moored at the 1st Service School of the Maritime Self-Defense Force at Etajima and used as a berthing training ship.

She was stricken on 30 March 1983.

References

1955 ships
Ships built by Mitsui Engineering and Shipbuilding
Ships of the Japan Maritime Self-Defense Force